Beukers is a Dutch surname. Notable people with the surname include:

 Frits Beukers (born 1953), Dutch mathematician
 Nicole Beukers (born 1990), Dutch rower
 Petrus Beukers (1899–1981), Dutch sailor

See also
 Beckers

Dutch-language surnames